State Route 53 (SR 53) is a primary state highway in the U.S. state of Virginia.  Known as Thomas Jefferson Parkway, the state highway runs  from SR 20 near Charlottesville east to U.S. Route 15 (US 15) in Palmyra.  SR 53 connects the county seats of Albemarle and Fluvanna counties.  The state highway also provides access to the community of Lake Monticello and Monticello, the estate of Thomas Jefferson.  The route of SR 53 became a state highway in 1930; the highway receives its present designation in 1947.

Route description

SR 53 begins at an intersection with SR 20 (Scottsville Road) a short distance south of SR 20's interchange with Interstate 64 in Albemarle County just south of the independent city of Charlottesville.  The state highway heads east and begins to ascend Carters Mountain, which is part of the Southwest Mountains.  Just west of Michie Tavern, SR 53 winds as it continues to its summit between Monticello to the east and Montalto, also known as the Mountaintop Farm and Patterson Mountain, to the west.  A two-way ramp connects SR 53 with the Monticello access road, which passes over the state highway.

SR 53 has a few more curves as it descends the mountain to the hamlet of Simeon, where the highway intersects SR 795 (James Monroe Parkway).  SR 795 leads south to the estate of James Monroe, Ashlawn-Highland.  SR 53 crosses Buck Island Creek near its confluence with the Rivanna River before entering Fluvanna County.  The state highway passes along the western edge of the suburban resort community of Lake Monticello, which is centered around the lake of the same name.  The state highway reaches its eastern terminus at US 15 (James Madison Highway) just south of the U.S. Highway's crossing of the Rivanna River in Palmyra, the county seat.

History
A small piece of SR 53, from the west end at SR 20 towards Monticello, was added to the state highway system in 1930 (along with SR 20 north to Charlottesville) as State Route 714; it became State Route 239 in the 1933 renumbering. In 1941, State Route 20 was extended north from Scottsville to Charlottesville via Blenheim and Overton, absorbing SR 239. SR 20 was shifted west to its current alignment in 1947; at the same time, current SR 53 was upgraded from State Route 642, and a short piece of old SR 20 became SR 53.

Major intersections

References

External links

Virginia Highways Project: VA 53

053
State Route 053
State Route 053